Anacapa Island (Chumash: Anyapax, meaning "mirage, illusion") is a small volcanic island located about  off the coast of Port Hueneme, California, in Ventura County. The three main islets, East, Middle and West Anacapa, are collectively known as The Anacapas by some authors. All three islets have precipitous cliffs, dropping off steeply into the sea.

Anacapa is the smallest of the northern islands of the Channel Islands archipelago, and is within the Channel Islands National Park. It lies southwest of the city of Ventura.

Geography and geology 
Along with Santa Barbara Island, Anacapa was formed by volcanic eruptions between 19 and 15 million years ago. These eruptions are believed to have been caused by thinning of ocean crust as the block containing the northern Channel Islands and Santa Monica mountains was rotated clockwise by the transverse motion of the Pacific and North American plates. The rocks that make up Anacapa are composed of lava, breccias, volcanic ash and cinders.

Erosion has heavily weathered the lava formations of Anacapa, and wave action caused the island to split into three islets in recent prehistoric times. The islets display a wide variety of erosional features including sea arches, sea caves, stacks, wave-cut platforms, surge channels and blowholes.

East and Middle Anacapa have fairly level areas at their tops.

East Island's most notable natural feature is Arch Rock, a -high natural bridge.

Fossils of pygmy mammoths from this Late Pleistocene period 13,000 years ago have been found on the other three northern islands and it is reasonable to assume pygmy mammoths were also present on Anacapa.

In The Channel Islands of California (1910), Charles Frederick Holder says of Anacapa:

Ecology
Great white sharks, feeding on pinnipeds, are found in the waters of the Channel Islands, including Anacapa. The island has a somewhat diverse flora, including around 150 native plants, including 16 endemics (two of which are unique to the island) plus many introduced species.

Birds 
Anacapa has around 69 species of birds.  The island's steep lava rock cliffs incorporate numerous caves and crevices that are particularly important for the increasingly rare seabird Scripps's murrelet (a threatened species known as Xantus's murrelet until 2012). The cliffs are also an important location for the ashy storm-petrel.  The largest breeding colony of the California brown pelican in the United States, and one of the only two in California, also occurs on Anacapa Island.  This is where the brown pelican has been able to recover so dramatically from near extinction in the 1970s. The islets of Anacapa also host the largest breeding colony of western gull in the world. Western gulls begin their nesting efforts at the end of April, sometimes making their shallow nests just inches from trails. Fluffy chicks hatch in May and June and fly away from the nests in July.

Mammals, reptiles and amphibians
The only native land mammal on the island is a unique subspecies of deer mouse (Peromyscus maniculatus anacapae) which occurs on all three islets, but nowhere else. (San Clemente Island in the southern Channel Islands also has an endemic subspecies of deer mouse.)

Anacapa has two native reptiles: an endemic form of the side-blotched lizard (Uta stansburiana hesperis); and the less-common California alligator lizard (Elgaria multicarinata multicarinata). There is one amphibian, the Channel Islands slender salamander (Batrachoseps pacificus). Marine mammals and other marine life abound on Anacapa.

Vegetation 
During its blooming season, March to May, it bursts forth with a mass of showy, bright yellow flowers and green leaves. Giant coreopsis provided shelter and perches for seabirds and land birds, and nesting habitat for many. The prolific seeds provided abundant food for the endemic Anacapa deer mouse, and for many small birds. The island's stands of giant coreopsis, as well as all the other plants of its coastal bluff community, were devastated by sheep grazing in the late 1800s and early 1900s, rabbit browsing in 1910-1950s, and by large-scale destruction of native vegetation associated with facility and road development by the U.S. Coast Guard during construction and manning of the Anacapa Light Station. Only small patches and individuals of native plants remained.

Malacothrix junakii is a rare species of aster known by the common names Anacapa Island desert-dandelion, Junak's desert dandelion, and Junak's malacothrix that is endemic to Anacapa, where it is known from just two occurrences.  It occurs in the coastal scrub of the island and was described to science as a new species in 1997.

Introduced species 
Introduced mammals on Anacapa Island included cats, sheep, rabbits and black rats.

Black rats (Rattus rattus), also known as ship rats, had a major impact on wildlife on Anacapa Island, including seabirds, such as Scripps's murrelet, reptiles and amphibians, intertidal and terrestrial invertebrates and vegetation. Before an eradication program in 2001–02, more than 96 percent of Scripps's Murrelet nests on Anacapa were attacked by invasive rats. The rats were certainly introduced sometime prior to 1939 (when they were noted by NPS researchers Sumner and Bond), probably in supplies brought onto the island for sheep ranching or building the lighthouse. The National Park Service says there is evidence they were present in 1907. A 1979 study noted that they could have been introduced from a shipwreck such as the SS Winfield Scott in 1853.

European rabbits were introduced to East Island either as an emergency food supply for lighthouse personnel during World War II or as pets. They were present from the 1940s until at least 1965. No rabbits were recorded from Middle or West Anacapa.

Domestic cats were introduced to Anacapa as pets of the fisherman "Frenchy" after whom Frenchy's Cove on West Island is named. In 1966, there remained a small population.

Sheep were grazed on the island for many years. There are records from the 1870s through the 1930s. Many writers reported that in the absence of springs on Anacapa sheep would lick the moisture that accumulated on each other's fleeces from the coastal fog. The native flora was affected by the forage grasses that farmers introduced to feed their flocks, and by soil-compaction caused by the sheep's hooves. Reproduction of ground-nesting species such as the meadowlark and horned lark is also thought to have been harmed by grazing.

After completion of the lighthouse and associated facilities, the Coast Guard planted two types of iceplant on East Anacapa Islet: red-flowered iceplant (Malephora crocea) and sea fig, also called freeway iceplant (Carpobrotus edulis x aequilaterus).  Both species are highly invasive. The National Park Service has initiated a restoration project to eradicate all of the ice plant by 2016, the centennial of the National Park Service Organic Act.

Restoration 
Vegetation on Anacapa began to recover after the removal of sheep about 1938 and rabbits in the 1950s.

Black rats were successfully eradicated from Anacapa Island by 2003, under a controversial program that involved an aerial application of the rodenticide brodifacoum. This was the first time a rodenticide had been applied aerially in North America (the technique was pioneered in New Zealand). One complicating factor was the presence of the native deer mouse subspecies (Peromyscus maniculatus anacapae). This was the first time that biologists had attempted to eradicate one rodent species from an entire island where an endemic rodent was present.

A tool called Population Viability Analysis, or PVA, is a species-specific method used to assess the probability of a population's extinction in a given number of years. Based on the result of a study, PVA determined that a population of 333 deer mice had a high chance of survival. Approximately 300 deer mice were captured prior to the application of rodenticide and reintroduced after poison levels had dropped, which was about three months. The program cost about $1.8 million.

A study after the eradication project showed that nesting attempts by Scripps's murrelets on Anacapa had more than doubled, average hatching success was up from 42 to 80 percent average nest predation was down from 52 to 7 percent. Only four months after the rodenticide applications, Cassin's auklet (Ptychoramphus aleuticus) began nesting on Anacapa. This was significant as there were no previous records of the bird nesting on the island and it is known to be highly susceptible to rat predation.

Climate
This region experiences warm and dry summers and mild winters with no average monthly temperatures above . Its climate is greatly moderated by the Pacific Ocean. According to the Köppen Climate Classification system, Anacapa Island has a warm-summer Mediterranean climate, abbreviated "Csb" on climate maps.

History

Anacapa is the only one of the Channel Islands to have a non-Spanish-derived name. Anacapa comes from the Chumash word 'Anyapax, meaning "illusion".  Juan Rodriguez Cabrillo passed by the island in 1542, but it was George Vancouver who labeled it Enecapa on his 1790 chart, while the U.S. Coast and Geodetic Survey labeled it Anacapa in 1854.

On the night of December 2, 1853, the sidewheel steamer Winfield Scott running at full speed crashed into the rocks off Middle Anacapa and sank. All of the passengers survived and were rescued after a week.

George Nidever was the first person to raise sheep on the island, starting in the 1850s or 1860s.  Louis le Mesnager then signed a 5-year lease with the federal government around 1897, but his lease and sheep were taken over by Herman Bayfield Webster in 1907.  His Sheep Camp operation was located on Middle Anacapa, which included 5 shacks and about 500 sheep.  Ira Eaton acquired the lease in 1917 and held it until 1927, and used the island for his bootleg alcohol operation during Prohibition in the United States.  The next resident of the island was Raymond (Frenchy) LeDreau who occupied 4 shacks on West Anacapa at Frenchy's Cove, living as a recluse for the next 30 years, departing the island in his eighties after the island had become a National Monument.

On a visit around 1910, Charles Frederick Holder noted "kitchen-middens, and deposits of ancient shells, and the tell-tale black earth" of hearths.

The Lighthouse Bureau built an acetylene-powered light and whistling buoy in 1912 at the east end of the island, and constructed the East Anacapa Island Light between 1930 and 1932. It was the last lighthouse built by the bureau on the California coast. The facility was staffed by United States Coast Guard 6-man crews serving 2-year tours of duty from 1939 onwards.  The facility included Mission Revival houses, a heavy-lift boom for raising supply boats, 3 2000 gallon fuel tanks, a 30,000 square foot water catchment basin, and 2 large redwood water tanks housed in a building.  Combined with their families, there were 15-25 residents on the island at any given time.  Plans were implemented in 1962 to automate the facility and some buildings were demolished, though the houses were spared.  The Coast Guard still owns the property, but the National Park Service moved into the residences in 1970, while sharing the wharf and hoist facilities.

Frenchy's Cove was cleaned up starting in June 1959, and a permanent park ranger replaced the seasonal one in the mid-1970s.

On January 31, 2000, Alaska Airlines Flight 261 crashed near the island.

Along with the Channel Islands Beach area of Port Hueneme, the island is in Census Tract 36.12 of Ventura County, California. The official 2000 census population was 3 permanent residents (at the ranger station in the eastern part of East Island).

Gallery

See also
Alaska Airlines Flight 261
Anacapa Island Archeological District
Anacapa Island Light
List of islands of California
 Restoring Balance: Anacapa Island video in the National Park Service page.
 Achieving Balance: Anacapa Island Ten Years Later video in the National Park Service page.

References

Sources

External links

Channel Islands National Park
Channel Islands National Marine Sanctuary
Anacapa Island Site with Photos and History
Winfield Scott History 
Anacapa Island Restoration Blog 
Volunteer on Anacapa Island! 

Islands of the Channel Islands of California
Volcanoes of California
Volcanic islands
Landforms of Ventura County, California
Channel Islands National Park
Island restoration
Natural arches of California
West Coast of the United States
Islands of Southern California
Islands of California